The International Telecommunications Satellite Organization (ITSO) is an intergovernmental organization charged with overseeing the public service obligations of Intelsat, which was privatized in 2001.

It incorporates the principle set forth in Resolution 1721 (XVI) of United Nations General Assembly, which expresses "All nations should have access to satellite communications".

The landmark headquarters of this organization was located in Washington D.C., United States.

As of June 2013, there are 149 states that are members of ITSO. States join ITSO by ratifying a multilateral treaty known as the Agreement relating to the International Telecommunications Satellite Organization. 
Bulgaria ratified the treaty in 1996 but denounced it and withdrew from the organization in 2012.

Satellite Fleet

References

External links
 

Intelsat
International telecommunications
Intergovernmental organizations established by treaty